"Never Let You Go" is a song performed by Dima Bilan at the 2006 Eurovision Song Contest, where he represented  and ended up in 2nd place.

At the performance in Athens, Dima Bilan wears a white tank top with a number representing his place in the contest's running order – 13 in the semi-final and 10 in the final.
Bilan was surrounded by two ballerinas dancing in the background and a white piano covered in red rose petals, from which a ghost-like female figure emerged halfway through the song.

On the night of the semi-final the song was performed 13th, following 's Ich Troje with "Follow My Heart" and preceding 's Sibel Tüzün with "Süper Star". The song received 217 points, placing 3rd in a field of 23 and proceeding to the final.

On the night of the final Bilan performed 10th in the running order, following 's Sidsel Ben Semmane with "Twist of Love" and preceding 's Elena Risteska with "Ninanajna". The song received 248 points, finishing second behind 's Lordi with "Hard Rock Hallelujah".

This was Russia's best showing at Eurovision up to that time. He beat Alsou, who also came 2nd in the Eurovision Song Contest 2000, but by only 155 points. Nevertheless, Alsou received 53.8% of the maximum possible points from 24 countries in 2000, whilst Bilan's final tally equated to 54.4% of the maximum possible score available from the 38 voting countries.

The song was succeeded as Russian representative by Serebro with "Song #1".

Dima Bilan performed the song at the World Music Awards in Earls Court on 15 November 2006.

Charts

Weekly charts

Year-end charts

References

2006 songs
Eurovision songs of 2006
Eurovision songs of Russia
Dima Bilan songs
Songs with lyrics by Karen Kavaleryan
English-language Russian songs